The following is a timeline of the history of the city of Syracuse, Sicily, Italy. Syracuse was the main city of Sicily from 5th century BCE to 878 CE.

Prior to 17th century

 8th C. BCE – Settlement established by Corinthian Greeks.(it)
 663 BCE - Founded the settlement of Akrai.
 643 BCE - Founded the settlement of Casmenae.
 6th C. BCE – Greek Theatre of Syracuse built.
 598 BCE - Founded the settlement of Kamarina.
 498–491 BCE - Hippocrates of Gela threatened the independence of Syracuse.
 491–478 BCE - Gelon is tyrant of Syracuse.
 480 BCE - Gelon defeats Carthage at the Battle of Himera.
 415–413 BCE – Syracuse besieged by Greek forces.
 397 BCE - Siege of Syracuse (397 BC)
 343 BCE - Siege of Syracuse (343 BC) 
 311-309 BCE - Siege of Syracuse (311–309 BC)
 287 BCE – Birth of mathematician Archimedes (approximate date).
 278 BCE - Siege of Syracuse (278 BC)
 214 BCE – Siege of Syracuse (213–212 BC) by Roman forces.
 44 BCE – People of Syracuse (and Sicily) gain Roman citizenship.
 2nd–4th C. CE – Roman Catholic diocese of Siracusa established.
 3rd C. CE – Death of bishop .
 278–280 CE – Syracuse sacked by Franks.
 304 – Death of Christian St. Lucia Of Syracuse during the Diocletianic Persecution.
 535 – Syracuse taken Belisarius of the Byzantine Empire.
 668 – 15 September: Assassination of Byzantine emperor Constans II.
 827-828 - Siege of Syracuse (827–828).
 877–878 – Siege of Syracuse (877–878) by Aghlabid forces.
 1088 – Syracuse besieged by forces of Roger I of Sicily.
 1140 – Earthquake.(it)
 1239 – Castello Maniace built.
 1397 – Palazzo Montalto built on Ortygia island.
 1448 – Unrest.
 1542 – Earthquake.(it)

17th–19th centuries
 1633 –  built.
 1673 – Porta Ligny (gate) built.
 1693 – 1693 Sicily earthquake.
 1710 – 9 November: Naval Battle of Syracuse (1710) fought near city during the War of the Spanish Succession.
 1753 – Cathedral of Syracuse built.
 1757 – Earthquake.
 1779 – Palazzo Beneventano del Bosco rebuilt.
 1790 – Maritime navigation school established.
 1854 –  built.
 1860 – 1 August: Forces of Garabaldi arrive in city.
 1861 – Population: 19,590.
 1862 – Syracuse Chamber of Commerce established.
 1865 – Province of Syracuse created.
 1867 – Biblioteca comunale (library) founded.
 1870 – Gazzetta di Siracusa newspaper begins publication.
 1871
 Siracusa railway station opens.
  (railway) begins operating.
 1880 – Tamburo newspaper begins publication.
 1881 - Population: 21,739.
 1886
 Siracusa–Gela–Canicattì railway (railway) begins operating.
 Museo Archeologico Nazionale di Siracusa (museum) opens.
 1897
  (theatre) opens.
 Population: 25,740.

20th century
 1907 –  (fountain) installed in Piazza Archimede.
 1911 – Population: 40,835.
 1915 –  (railway) begins operating.
 1920 – Giornale di Siracusa newspaper in publication.
 1924
 13 August: Benito Mussolini visits city.
 A.S. Siracusa (football club) formed.
 1928 – Strada statale 115 Sud Occidentale Sicula (Trapani-Syracuse roadway) opens.
 1934 – Palazzo delle Poste (post office) built.
 1938
  industrial railway station begins operating.
  construction begins at Piazza dei Cappuccini.
 1941 – Bombing of Syracuse during World War II begins.(it)
 1943: 9–10 July: City taken by British forces.
 1948 – Bellomo Palace Regional Gallery opens.
 1950 – Augusta-Priolo petrochemical complex begins operating near city.
 1951 – Population: 66,090.(it)
 1953
  (weeping statue) allegedly occurs, according to tradition.
 Syracuse Commonwealth War Graves Commission Cemetery established near city.
 1960
  (race) begins.
  opens (approximate date).
 1961 – Population: 83,205.(it)
 1963 – Archivio di Stato di Siracusa (state archives) active.
 1990 – 13 December: 1990 Carlentini earthquake occurs.
 1991 – Population: 125,941.(it)
 1994 –  built.
 1996 – U.S. Siracusa (football club) active.
 1999
  (puppet theatre) established.
  becomes mayor.

21st century
 2005 – Syracuse and the Rocky Necropolis of Pantalica designated an UNESCO World Heritage Site.
 2008 –  becomes mayor.
 2009
 April:  meeting of environmental leaders held in city.
  (bike path) opens.
 2013
 June: Italian local elections, 2013 held.
 20 September: 400+ refugees of the Syrian Civil War arrive at port of Syracuse.
  becomes mayor.
 Siracusa Calcio football club active.
 Population: 118,644.
 2015 – Regional  created (replacing Province of Syracuse).

See also
 Syracuse history
 
 
 Origins of Syracuse (in Italian)
 History of Syracuse: Greek period (in Italian)
 History of Syracuse: medieval period (in Italian)
 History of Syracuse: modern period (circa 16th-19th centuries; in Italian)
 History of Syracuse: fascist period (in Italian)
 History of Syracuse: contemporary period (in Italian)
 List of mayors of Syracuse, Sicily
 List of bishops of Syracuse
 History of Sicily
 Timelines of other cities in the macroregion of Insular Italy:(it)
 Sardinia: Timeline of Cagliari
 Sicily: Timeline of Catania, Messina, Palermo, Trapani

References

This article incorporates information from the Italian Wikipedia.

Bibliography

in English
 
 
 
  (+ 1867 ed.)

in Italian

  (+ via Internet Archive)

External links

  (city archives)
 Items related to Syracuse, various dates (via Europeana)
 Items related to Syracuse, various dates (via Digital Public Library of America)

Images

 
Syracuse, Sicily